Linda Gorton is an American politician currently serving as the mayor of Lexington, Kentucky. Gorton previously spent 4 years as vice mayor and 16 more on the Lexington-Fayette Urban County Council, becoming the longest-serving member of that council. She is also a registered nurse. Gorton was elected mayor in 2018 in a nonpartisan election. She was re-elected in 2022.

Electoral history

References

1948 births
American nurses
American women nurses
Kentucky Republicans
Living people
Mayors of Lexington, Kentucky
University of Kentucky alumni
Women mayors of places in Kentucky
21st-century American women